Victor A. Olander (November 28, 1873 – February 5, 1949) was an American labor union leader.

Born in Chicago, Olander began working as a sailor when he was fourteen years old.  While serving on the Great Lakes, he studied the law relating to seafarers.  In 1899, he joined the Lake Seamen's Union, an affiliate of the International Seamen's Union (ISU).

In 1901, Olander was elected as business agent of the Lake Seamen, then as assistant secretary in 1903, and as secretary in 1909.  In 1902, he was additionally elected as the vice-president of the ISU.  In 1914, he added the post of secretary-treasurer of the Illinois Federation of Labor, while during World War I, he was also on the National War Labor Board and the Illinois State Council of Defense.

Olander started losing his sight in 1916, and by 1920, he was completely blind.  He stood down from his post with the Lake Seamen, but retained his other roles.  His sight was restored by an operation in 1924.  In 1925, he was elected as secretary-treasurer of the ISU, serving until 1936, and in 1927, he became secretary of the resolutions committee of the American Federation of Labor, serving for six years.

Olander died in 1949, while still holding his Illinois Federation of Labor post.

References

1873 births
1949 deaths
American blind people
American trade union leaders
People from Chicago
Trade unionists from Illinois